A Preference Pane (often abbreviated as prefpane) is a special dynamically loaded plugin in macOS. Introduced in Mac OS X v10.0, the purpose of a Preference Pane is to allow the user to set preferences for a specific application or the system by means of a graphical user interface. Preference Panes are the macOS replacement for control panels in the classic Mac OS. Prior to Mac OS X v10.4, collections of Preference Panes featured a "Show All" button to show all the panes in the collection and a customizable toolbar to which frequently-used preference panes could be dragged. In Mac OS X v10.3, the currently-active pane would also be highlighted in the toolbar when it was selected. With Mac OS X v10.4, this functionality was dropped in favor of a plain Show All button and back/forward history arrows.

System Settings is an application whose sole purpose is the loading of various preference panes, for system configuration. Any application can be written to use prefpanes.

Preference panes carry the .prefpane file extension.

External links
Apple Developer Connection – Preference Panes

MacOS